Strickler Family Farmhouse, also known as the County Farm, is a historic home located at Springettsbury Township, York County, Pennsylvania.

Description
The farmhouse consists of three sections: a -story, 2 bay by 1 bay, Germanic influenced limestone main house; a -story, brick Georgian-style wing, built about 1835; and a 2-story brick ell, built about 1865. Also on the property is the Strickler family cemetery, with burials dating back to the 1700s.

History
Ulrich and Mary Strickler purchased 200 acres of farmland west of the Susqeuhanna River from the Penn family and immigrated to Pennsylvania in 1737. Samuel Strickler was born in the stone house in 1875. The family sold the farm in the early 20th century and it was sold in 1943 to York County and used for a prison site. For a few years, the federal immigration service used the house for office space, before it went unused. Three generations of family members visited the house in July 2020 after learning of its ancestral link.

NRHP registration, demolition plans, and saving
The home was added to the National Register of Historic Places in 1991. As of October 2019, the farmhouse faced demolition after York County's plans to move its coroner's office there were cancelled. Nearly half a million dollars of repairs, including mold mitigation, were required for such a use of the structure, and only $11,000 of donations were obtained. Also in autumn 2019, York County hired a consulting firm to document the history of the farmhouse. In October 2021, it was announced that the property had been saved from demolition, with county commissioners approving a 99-year rent-free lease to local organization Historic York, who will preserve and maintain it.

References

Georgian architecture in Pennsylvania
Houses completed in 1865
Houses in York County, Pennsylvania
Houses on the National Register of Historic Places in Pennsylvania
National Register of Historic Places in York County, Pennsylvania
Springettsbury Township, York County, Pennsylvania
Unused buildings in Pennsylvania